The JSB Legacy is the 6th studio album by Japanese group Sandaime J Soul Brothers from Exile Tribe. It was released on March 30, 2016. It reached the number-one place on the weekly Oricon Albums Chart on its release week. The album is the 2nd best-selling album of the year in Japan for 2016 and it is the fourth album by the group to reach number one.

Track listing

Charts
THE JSB LEGACY - Oricon Sales Chart (Japan)

References

2016 albums